The women's tournament of the 2020 New Holland Canadian Junior Curling Championships was held from January 18 to 26 at the George Preston Recreation Centre and the Langley Curling Centre.

In the final, Mackenzie Zacharias and her rink of Karlee Burgess, Emily Zacharias and Lauren Lenentine out of the Altona Curling Club in Altona, Manitoba capped off a perfect 11–0 record defeating Alberta's Abby Marks rink 10–3 including a score of four in the eighth end. It was a third championship win for Burgess as she also won the title in 2016 and 2018. Team Zacharias represented Canada at the 2020 World Junior Curling Championships in Krasnoyarsk, Russia and won the gold medal.

Teams
The teams are listed as follows:

Round-robin standings
Final round-robin standings

Round-robin results
All draw times are listed in Eastern Standard Time (UTC−5:00).

Pool A

Draw 1
Saturday, January 18, 9:00 am

Draw 2
Saturday, January 18, 2:00 pm

Draw 3
Saturday, January 18, 7:30 pm

Draw 4
Sunday, January 19, 9:00 am

Draw 5
Sunday, January 19, 2:00 pm

Draw 6
Sunday, January 19, 7:00 pm

Draw 7
Monday, January 20, 9:00 am

Draw 8
Monday, January 20, 2:00 pm

Draw 9
Monday, January 20, 7:00 pm

Draw 10
Tuesday, January 21, 9:00 am

Draw 11
Tuesday, January 21, 2:00 pm

Draw 12
Tuesday, January 21, 7:00 pm

Pool B

Draw 1
Saturday, January 18, 9:00 am

Draw 2
Saturday, January 18, 2:00 pm

Draw 3
Saturday, January 18, 7:30 pm

Draw 4
Sunday, January 19, 9:00 am

Draw 5
Sunday, January 19, 2:00 pm

Draw 6
Sunday, January 19, 7:00 pm

Draw 7
Monday, January 20, 9:00 am

Draw 8
Monday, January 20, 2:00 pm

Draw 9
Monday, January 20, 7:00 pm

Draw 10
Tuesday, January 21, 9:00 am

Draw 11
Tuesday, January 21, 2:00 pm

Draw 12
Tuesday, January 21, 7:00 pm

Placement round

Seeding pool

Standings
Final Seeding Pool Standings

Draw 14
Wednesday, January 22, 2:00 pm

Draw 15
Wednesday, January 22, 7:00 pm

Draw 16
Thursday, January 23, 9:00 am

Draw 17
Thursday, January 23, 2:00 pm

Draw 18
Thursday, January 23, 7:00 pm

Draw 20
Friday, January 24, 2:00 pm

Championship pool

Championship pool standings
Final Championship Pool Standings

Draw 14
Wednesday, January 22, 2:00 pm

Draw 15
Wednesday, January 22, 7:00 pm

Draw 16
Thursday, January 23, 9:00 am

Draw 17
Thursday, January 23, 2:00 pm

Draw 18
Thursday, January 23, 7:00 pm

Draw 19
Friday, January 24, 9:00 am

Tiebreakers
Friday, January 24, 2:00 pm

Saturday, January 25, 11:00 am

Playoffs

Semifinal
Saturday, January 25, 4:00 pm

Final
Sunday, January 26, 9:00 am

References

External links

Junior Championships
Canadian Junior Curling Championships, 2020
Canadian Junior Curling Championships
Canadian Junior Curling